Pape Matar Sarr (born 14 September 2002) is a Senegalese professional footballer who plays as a midfielder for Premier League club Tottenham Hotspur and the Senegal national team.

Club career 
Pape Matar Sarr made his professional debut with Génération Foot in his native country of Senegal, before signing a five-year contract with Ligue 1 side Metz on 15 September 2020.

Sarr was initially sent to play for Metz's second team in Championnat National 2, but made only one appearance before he was recalled to the first team squad following the season being halted due to the COVID-19 pandemic in France. He made his debut for the Metz first team on 29 November 2020 in a Ligue 1 game against Brest. On 31 January 2021, Sarr scored his first goal in Ligue 1 in the reverse fixture, a 4–2 away victory over Brest.

On 27 August 2021, Sarr signed for Premier League club Tottenham Hotspur. He was loaned back to Metz until the end of the 2021–22 season. On 1 January 2023, Sarr finally made his long awaited Premier League debut coming on as a 80th minute substitute for Yves Bissouma in a 2-0 home loss to Aston Villa. Since his first appearance against Aston Villa Sarr has featured regularly for Spurs, either coming off the bench or starting as was the case in the North London derby loss to Arsenal.

International career 
Sarr made his debut for Senegal national team on 26 March 2021 in an AFCON 2021 qualifier against Congo. On 6 February 2022, he won the 2021 Africa Cup of Nations with Senegal.

Career statistics

Club

International

Honours
Senegal
Africa Cup of Nations: 2021

Individual
 CAF Youth Player of the Year: 2022

References

External links

Profile at the Tottenham Hotspur F.C. website

2002 births
Living people
People from Dakar Region
Senegalese footballers
Senegal youth international footballers
Senegal international footballers
Association football midfielders
Génération Foot players
FC Metz players
Tottenham Hotspur F.C. players
Ligue 1 players
Championnat National 2 players
2021 Africa Cup of Nations players
2022 FIFA World Cup players
Africa Cup of Nations-winning players
Senegalese expatriate footballers
Expatriate footballers in England
Senegalese expatriate sportspeople in England